Old Harbour may refer to :

Old Harbour, Jamaica, town
The Old Harbour, Kingston upon Hull, early harbouring point on the River Hull
The old harbour (porto antico) in Genoa, Italy
The Old Harbour in Weymouth, Dorset, England
The Old Harbour in Portencross, Scotland

See also
Old Harbor, Alaska